KPPL (92.5 FM) is a radio station broadcasting a Country music format. Licensed to Poplar Bluff, Missouri, United States.  The station is currently owned by George S. Flinn, Jr.

References

External links
 

Country radio stations in the United States
PPL